Silene is a genus of plants.

Silene may also refer to:
 Silenes, chemical compounds containing a Si=Si moiety
 Silenes (Si=C), chemical compounds containing a Si=C moiety
 Silene, the location of the story of Saint George and the Dragon
 , one of the lands of the historical Semigallia, Latvia
 , a village in Skrudaliena Parish, Lativa
 , a village in Salienas Parish, Lativa

See also 
 Silylene, another class of silicon compounds
 Silanes
 Selene (disambiguation)
 Seline (disambiguation)
 Silen (disambiguation)
 Sylene